A train wreck is the aftermath of a train crash.

Train wreck may also refer to:
Train wreck cluster, an astronomical galaxy cluster, also known as Abell 520
Trainwreck (film), a 2015 American film
Trainwreck with Kyle Gass, southern comedic rock band featuring Kyle Gass of Tenacious D
Trainwreck (band), heavy metal band from Bangladesh
Trainwreck (album), an album by Boys Night Out
"Trainwreck" (Banks song), 2016 song from the album The Altar
"Trainwreck", a song by Mastodon from their album Remission
"Trainwreck", a song by Demi Lovato from her album Don't Forget
"Train Wreck" (James Arthur song), a song by James Arthur from the album Back from the Edge
Trainwreck: My Life as an Idiot, a 2007 film also known as American Loser
"Train Wreck", an episode of the sitcom The King of Queens
 Trainwreck: Woodstock '99, a docuseries about the Woodstock '99 music festival

See also
Train Wreck Records, an independent record label founded by Chip Taylor
Trainwreck Circuits, an American boutique guitar amplifier manufacturer
Train wrecker (Neolentinus lepideus), a mushroom